The Southern Army Division (13. förd), was a division of the Swedish Army that operated in various forms from 1941 until 2000. Its staff was located in Kristianstad Garrison in Kristianstad. The unit was disbanded as a result of the disarmament policies set forward in the Defence Act of 2000.

Heraldry and traditions

Coat of arms
The coat of arms of the Eastern Army Division used from 1994 to 2000. Blazon: "Sable, the front of a tank with three bolts coming from each side of the turret, or. The shield surmounted two batons or, charged with open crowns azure, in saltire or."

Medals
In 2000, the Södra arméfördelningens (13.förd) minnesmedalj ("Southern Army Division (13.förd) Commemorative Merit") in silver (SFördSMM) of the 8th size was established. The medal ribbon is of black moiré with blue lines at the edges and two yellow lines on the middle.

Commanding officers
1994–1995: Senior Colonel Håkan Waernulf
1995–1998: Senior Colonel Björn Ivar Hedskog
1998–2000: Senior Colonel Mats Welff

Names, designations and locations

See also
Division

Footnotes

References

Notes

Print

Divisions of Sweden
Military units and formations established in 1941
Military units and formations disestablished in 2000
1941 establishments in Sweden
2000 disestablishments in Sweden
Disbanded units and formations of Sweden
Skövde Garrison
Kristianstad Garrison